Ammar Eloueini (born 1968 in Beirut, Lebanon) is an architect  who established AEDS | Ammar Eloueini Digit-all Studio in Paris in 1997. Since 1999 the office has operated with locations in Europe and the United States.

AEDS has completed projects at different scales in a range of geographic locations. From object design such as urban furniture for the city of New Orleans, to six retail spaces in Europe for Japanese fashion designer Issey Miyake, the office has developed an expertise in solving a wide range of design problems, while serving a wide range of clients including the Royal Norwegian Ministry of Petroleum and Energy, the Chicago Museum of Contemporary Art and choreographer John Jasperse in New York.

AEDS's work has been recognized with a series of awards such as the New York Architectural League’s Emerging Voices (2007), eleven AIA Design Excellence awards and the French Ministry of Culture Nouveaux Albums des Jeunes Architectes (2002). The work of Ammar Eloueini is part of five permanent collections: The Museum of Modern Art (MoMA) in New York, the Centre Pompidou in Paris, the Canadian Centre for Architecture (CCA) in Montreal, Disseny Hub Barcelona (DHUB) and The Ogden Museum of Southern Art in New Orleans.

Between 1999 and 2005, Ammar Eloueini chaired the Digital Media Program, as well as taught design studio, theory and digital fabrication courses at the University of Illinois at Chicago. Currently Eloueini is a professor at Tulane University and regularly serves as thesis advisor at the ENSCI in Paris.

Ammar Eloueini received, with honors, the degree of Diplômé par le Gouvernement from Paris-Villemin in 1994, and graduated with a Master of Science in Advanced Architectural Design from Columbia University in 1996. Eloueini has participated in several symposia and exhibitions, including “Mixing It Up With Mies” at the Canadian Centre for Architecture and the Venice Biennale. In addition to several solo and group shows, the work of Ammar Eloueini has been documented by two bilingual monographs, published by Damdi in Korea and AADCU in China.

Monographs
 Next AEDS, Ammar Eloueini, AADCU publisher, curated and edited by Bruce Q. Lan, hardcover, 
 DD 26 Digital Recall, AEDS Ammar Eloueini Digital Studio, hardcover, 
  CoReFab, Ammar Eloueini, paperback,

Permanent Collections
The work of Ammar Eloueini is part of five permanent collections.
The Museum of Modern Art (MoMA), CoReFab#116_25 chair (full scale), New York, USA
Centre Pompidou, 3 CoReFab#71 chairs (full scale), Paris, France
Canadian Centre for Architecture (CCA), 4 CoReFab#71 chairs (scale models), Montreal, Canada
Disseny Hub Barcelona (DHUB), 21 CoReFab#116 chairs (scale models), Barcelona, Spain
The Ogden Museum of Southern Art, 100 prints of CoReFab#71 chairs, New Orleans, USA

Awards and honors
2005-pres    11 AIA Design Excellence Awards
2012           MoMA PS1 Young Architects Program (YAP) Finalist
2007           Emerging Voices, Architectural League of New York
2006           Aides a la Creation unrestricted grant, VIA, CoReFab#71
2001-02      Nouveaux Albums des Jeunes Architectes (highest recognition for architects under 35), French Ministry of Culture
2001           Publication Grant, Graham Foundation for Advanced Studies in the Fine Arts

References
AEDS | Ammar Eloueini Digit-all Studio website
architect magazine article
AIA Honor Award for the Miyake store
Architectural Record article
MediaMente Rai Interview

1968 births
Living people
Tulane University faculty
Columbia Graduate School of Architecture, Planning and Preservation alumni
Lebanese architects